The 2015–16 Slovak Extraliga season was the 23rd season of the Slovak Extraliga, the highest level of ice hockey in Slovakia.

Teams
The following teams are participating in the 2015–16 season. The HK Orange 20 is a project for preparation of the Slovakia junior ice hockey team for the IIHF World U20 Championship. The team do not play complete regular season and cannot promote to the playoffs or get relegated. First 8 teams in table after the regular season (50 games) will promote to the playoffs.

Regular season

Playoffs
The seeding in Play-off is based on the ranking in Regular season. All Play-off rounds are played in the best-of-seven format, with the higher seeded team having the home advantage for the possible seventh game.

Playoff bracket

Relegation series (PlayOut)

Rules for classification: 1) Points; 2) Head-to-head points.

External links
Official website

Final rankings

Slovak Extraliga seasons
2015–16 in European ice hockey leagues
2015–16 in Slovak ice hockey leagues